Richard Dumas may refer to:

Rich Dumas (born 1945), retired American professional basketball player
Richard Dumas (born 1969), retired American professional basketball player
Richard Dumas (ice hockey) (born 1951), retired Canadian ice hockey goaltender